Alanduraiyarkattalai is a village in the Ariyalur taluk of Ariyalur district, Tamil Nadu, India.

Demographics 

 census, Alanduraiyarkattalai had a total population of 1795 with 911 males and 884 females.

References 

Villages in Ariyalur district